Pomathorn Halt railway station served the town of Penicuik, Midlothian, Scotland from 1855 to 1962 on the Peebles Railway.

History 
The station opened on 4 July 1855 by the Peebles Railway. The station was situated on the north side of the B6372. The station was originally called Penicuik, but it was renamed Pomathorn on 2 December 1872, although the station signs always called it 'Pomathorn for Penicuik'. The goods yard was accessed from the north and consisted of three sidings, two of which served a cattle dock. The station was downgraded to an unstaffed halt on 1 November 1946 and the suffix 'halt' was added to its name on 7 July 1947,  although it didn't appear on tickets or signs, just the timetables. 

Following the closure of Penicuik station in September 1951 - terminus of the Penicuik railway, half a mile nearer the centre of town - Pomarthorn became Penicuik's only station. It closed to passengers and goods traffic on 5 February 1962.

References

External links 

Disused railway stations in Midlothian
Former North British Railway stations
Railway stations in Great Britain opened in 1855
Railway stations in Great Britain closed in 1962
1855 establishments in Scotland
1962 disestablishments in Scotland